Robert Garfield Books (March 1, 1903 – April 4, 1958) was an American football fullback who played one season with the Frankford Yellow Jackets of the National Football League (NFL). He played college football at Dickinson College. He first enrolled at Harrisburg Technical High School in Harrisburg, Pennsylvania before transferring to Mercersburg Academy in Mercersburg, Pennsylvania.

Early years
Books was part of the 1919 Harrisburg Tech High School Football National Championship team before transferring to Mercersburg Academy in Mercersburg, Pennsylvania.

College career
Books played for the Dickinson Red Devils, where he was named team captain in 1925.

Professional career
Books played in four games for the Frankford Yellow Jackets of the NFL in 1926.

References

External links
Just Sports Stats
 

1903 births
1958 deaths
Players of American football from Pennsylvania
American football fullbacks
Dickinson Red Devils football players
Frankford Yellow Jackets players
People from Mercersburg, Pennsylvania
Burials in Pennsylvania